The King and Queen of Hearts Tour was a co-headlining tour by American singers Maxwell and Mary J. Blige. The tour began October 2016 in Europe then moved to North America. The North American leg of the tour grossed $13.1 million, averaged $545,000 per show, and ranked 90 on Pollstar's Top 200 North American Tours.

Background
The tour was announced in July 2016 on Facebook. According to Blige, the tour has been in the works for a few years. The duo felt because of their similar audiences and sound, touring together was an obvious decision. The tour is described as a celebration of 90s R&B. In the planning stages, the trek was titled "Maxwell & Mary on Stage, however, Blige came up with the current title. Dates in Europe were released in July with dates in North America followed in September.

Describing the tour, Maxwell stated:
"It's going to be a very beautiful chess game on stage, and the queen has all the moves. I feel like we're going to be able to magnify each other and take people to where they need to be in an emotional way, especially in a time where we have so much political unrest. It's kind of wild out there".

Opening act
Ro James

Setlist
The following setlists were performed on October 15, 2016 at the Jahrhunderthalle in Frankfurt, Germany. They do not represent all concerts for the duration of the tour.

Tour dates

References

2016 concert tours
Mary J. Blige concert tours
Maxwell (musician) concert tours
Co-headlining concert tours